Ngandi is an extinct Australian Aboriginal language of the Wilton River, Northern Territory. It is closely related to Nunggubuyu.

In 2017 the last fluent speaker of Ngandi, Cherry Wulumirr Daniels, began teaching the language to younger people at Ngukurr. She died in 2019.

A short film, Lil Bois, written in the language and directed by Daniels's nephew, was released in 2018.

References

Gunwinyguan languages
Extinct languages of Oceania
Languages_extinct_in_the_2010s